Flashpoint is an Elseworlds limited series published by DC Comics in 1999, written by Pat McGreal, with art by Norm Breyfogle.

Plot summary
In this story's alternate universe, Barry Allen was the only ever costumed hero in existence as the Flash. He becomes a quadriplegic after saving JFK from assassination by taking a bullet in the spine. Although his body is permanently disabled, his brilliant, accelerated mind has created futuristic technologies such as intergalactic travel via sub-space drive and matter teleportation.
A mission to Mars, funded by Barry's company, has uncovered a strange artifact. The energies released by the artifact have accelerated astronaut/space scientist Wally West - nephew to Barry via his marriage to Iris West - in a similar fashion to the accident that made Barry the Flash. The energies have also put Wally into a coma. Barry brings Wally to Immortality Inc. - run by fellow scientist Vandal Savage - in an attempt to cure Wally. But Wally's fellow astronaut James Jesse has stolen the artifact to give to Savage, and Vandal's machinations have focused on trying to clone Wally rather than cure him, resulting in Wally's death.
To make matters worse, Barry's mind is consumed with his past accomplishments as the Flash, as well as "memories" of another reality where he was part of a team of superheroes, including other speedsters. Barry begins to question his own sanity as events begin to unfold far from his control.

One of Wally's clones has survived and escaped Savage's company, believing itself to be the real Wally. Barry, in a desperate attempt to save his "nephew", lures Wally to him and transports them both to his sub-space vessel Odysseus. Barry drains the clone's speed energy into his chair, which passes into him. The energy causes his body to regenerate, and Barry is slowly regaining his mobility.
Re-energized but still not at full strength, Barry confronts Savage, who now possesses the artifact. Savage activates the artifact, releasing strange energies that strike Barry before he can prevent it. As Barry is accelerated by the energy, he disappears into his "imagined" reality. Under orders from President Kennedy, a sniper shoots Savage in the head, killing him instantly. Barry is believed dead - killed by Savage's use of the artifact - and mourned in his reality. In truth, he lives again as the Flash in a new reality, surrounded by family and friends—many of them with their own super powers.

References

1999 comics debuts
Elseworlds titles
Works about John F. Kennedy
Cultural depictions of John F. Kennedy
Comics set in the United States
Dallas in fiction
Fiction set in 1963
Comics set in the 1960s
Flash (comics)
Comics about time travel
Comics about multiple time paths